Königshain is a municipality in the district Görlitz, Saxony, Germany.

References 

Municipalities in Saxony
Populated places in Görlitz (district)